Wayne Black and Kevin Ullyett were the defending champions, but lost in the final this year..

Jonas Björkman and Max Mirnyi won the title, defeating Black and Ullyett 6–1, 6–2 in the final.

Seeds

Draw

Finals

Top half

Bottom half

References
Draw

2005 NASDAQ-100 Open
2005 ATP Tour